Natalia Pouzyreff (born 18 February 1961) is a French engineer and politician of La République En Marche! (LREM) who has been serving as a member of the French National Assembly since 2017, representing the department of Yvelines.

Early career
A graduate engineer from the École supérieure d'optique (IOGS), Pouzyreff worked with Thales and Airbus from 1986 to 2006. As Eurocopter representative for China, she lived in Beijing from 2006 to 2009.

Political career
 
Pouzyreff joined LREM in 2016. In parliament, Pouzyreff serves on the Defense Committee. In addition to her committee assignments, she is a member of the French-Chinese Parliamentary Friendship Group and the French-British Parliamentary Friendship Group.

In late 2019, Pouzyreff was one of 17 members of the committee who co-signed a letter to Prime Minister Édouard Philippe in which they warned that the 365 million euro ($406 million) sale of aerospace firm Groupe Latécoère to U.S. fund Searchlight Capital raised “questions about the preservation of know-how and France’s defense industry base” and urged government intervention.

See also
 2017 French legislative election

References

1961 births
Living people
Deputies of the 15th National Assembly of the French Fifth Republic
La République En Marche! politicians
21st-century French women politicians
People from Limoges
Politicians from Île-de-France
French women engineers
Women members of the National Assembly (France)
Members of Parliament for Yvelines
Deputies of the 16th National Assembly of the French Fifth Republic